Jarred Jakobi Vanderbilt (born April 3, 1999) is an American professional basketball player for the Los Angeles Lakers of the National Basketball Association (NBA). He played college basketball for the Kentucky Wildcats. In January 2017, Vanderbilt was selected as a McDonald's All-American. Vanderbilt is known for his great vertical jumping ability and his hustle.

Early life and high school career
Vanderbilt was born in Houston, Texas. He is the son of Gwendolyn and Robert Vanderbilt. He has two older brothers, Jamal and Robert, and three older sisters, Rean, Jenae, and Tasha. His father played basketball at Wiley College. His mother played at Xavier of Louisiana. His brother, Jamal, played at Texas-Tyler and sister, Jenae, played at UTSA. 

Vanderbilt attended Victory Prep Academy in Houston, Texas. As a senior, he averaged 28.5 points, 13.4 rebounds and 8.8 assists per game.

Recruiting
Vanderbilt was considered one of the best players in the 2017 recruiting class by Scout.com, Rivals.com and ESPN. On December 23, 2016 Vanderbilt committed to the Kentucky Wildcats.

College career
Despite being highly regarded coming out of high school, two injuries marred Vanderbilt's college career and he only played 14 games for the Kentucky Wildcats. He averaged 5.9 points and 7.9 rebounds in 17.0 minutes per game. Following the season he declared for the 2018 NBA draft.

Professional career

Denver Nuggets (2018–2020)
On June 21, 2018, Vanderbilt was drafted by the Orlando Magic with the 41st overall pick in the 2018 NBA draft. He was subsequently traded to the Denver Nuggets. On July 11, 2018, Vanderbilt signed with the Denver Nuggets. Vanderbilt made his NBA debut on January 25, 2019 in a 132–95 win over the Phoenix Suns, playing four minutes and scoring one point with three rebounds, an assist, and one steal. On November 20, 2019, Vanderbilt was assigned to the Rio Grande Valley Vipers.

Minnesota Timberwolves (2020–2022)
On February 5, 2020, Vanderbilt was traded to the Minnesota Timberwolves. Vanderbilt made his 2020 debut on December 27, 2020 in a 127-91 loss to the Los Angeles Lakers, playing fifteen minutes and scoring two points, seven rebounds, six assists, three steals, and a block. On January 23, 2021, Vanderbilt scored a career-high sixteen points along with eleven rebounds in a win against the New Orleans Pelicans.

On September 15, 2021, Vanderbilt re-signed with the Timberwolves. He started 67 games for the Timberwolves during the 2021-22 season, averaging career-highs of 6.9 points, 8.4 rebounds, and 1.3 steals per game. On April 12, 2022, Vanderbilt grabbed 10 rebounds and scored 3 points during Minnesota’s 109-104 play-in game victory over the Los Angeles Clippers.

Utah Jazz (2022–2023) 
On July 6, 2022, Vanderbilt was traded, alongside Malik Beasley, Patrick Beverley, Leandro Bolmaro, the draft rights to Walker Kessler, four future first round picks, and a pick swap, to the Utah Jazz in exchange for Rudy Gobert.

Los Angeles Lakers (2023–present)
On February 9, 2023, Vanderbilt was traded to the Los Angeles Lakers in a three-team trade involving the Minnesota Timberwolves. He made his Lakers debut two days later, recording 12 points, eight rebounds and four assists in a 109–103 win over the Golden State Warriors.

National team career
He won a gold medal with the 2015 USA U16 National Team at the 2015 FIBA Americas Under-16 Championship. He scored 19 points in 19 minutes of play at the 2017 Nike Hoop Summit, as Team USA defeated the World Select Team 98–87.

Career statistics

NBA

Regular season

|-
| style="text-align:left;"|
| style="text-align:left;"|Denver
| 17 || 0 || 4.1 || .474 || .000 || .600 || 1.4 || .2 || .4 || .1 || 1.4
|-
| style="text-align:left;"|
| style="text-align:left;"|Denver
| 9 || 0 || 4.5 || .714 || — || — || .9 || .2 || .3 || .1 || 1.1
|-
| style="text-align:left;"|
| style="text-align:left;"|Minnesota
| 2 || 0 || 2.5 || .000 || .000 || 1.000 || .5 || .0 || .0 || .0 || 1.0
|-
| style="text-align:left;"|
| style="text-align:left;"|Minnesota
| 64 || 30 || 17.8 || .606 || .200 || .559 || 5.8 || 1.2 || 1.0 || .7 || 5.4
|-
| style="text-align:left;"|
| style="text-align:left;"|Minnesota
| 74 || 67 || 25.4 || .587 || .143 || .656 || 8.4 || 1.3 || 1.3 || .6 || 6.9
|-
| style="text-align:left;"|
| style="text-align:left;"|Utah
| 52 || 41 || 24.1 || .556 || .333 || .657 || 7.9 || 2.7 || 1.0 || .3 || 8.3
|- class="sortbottom"
| style="text-align:center;" colspan="2"|Career
| 218|| 138 || 20.1 || .580 || .282 || .628 || 6.6 || 1.5 || 1.0 || .5 || 6.1

Playoffs

|-
| style="text-align:left;"|2019
| style="text-align:left;"|Denver
| 3 || 0 || 1.7 ||  ||  ||  || .3 || .0 || .0 || .3 || .0
|-
| style="text-align:left;"|2022
| style="text-align:left;"|Minnesota
| 6 || 6 || 21.5 || .481 ||  || .700 || 7.2 || .7 || 1.2 || .3 || 5.5
|- class="sortbottom"
| style="text-align:center;" colspan="2"|Career
| 9 || 6 || 14.9 || .481 ||  || .700 || 4.9 || .4 || .8 || .3 || 3.7

College

|-
| style="text-align:left;"|2017–18
| style="text-align:left;"|Kentucky
| 14 || 0 || 17.0 || .426 || .000 || .632 || 7.9 || 1.0 || .4 || .8 || 5.9

References

External links

 Kentucky Wildcats bio

1999 births
Living people
African-American basketball players
American men's basketball players
Basketball players from Houston
Delaware Blue Coats players
Denver Nuggets players
Iowa Wolves players
Kentucky Wildcats men's basketball players
Los Angeles Lakers players
McDonald's High School All-Americans
Minnesota Timberwolves players
Orlando Magic draft picks
Rio Grande Valley Vipers players
Small forwards
21st-century African-American sportspeople
Utah Jazz players